Laube is a German surname. Notable people with the surname include:

 Heinrich Laube (1806–1884), German dramatist, novelist and theatre-director
 Gustav Karl Laube (1839–1923), German geologist and paleontologist
 Eižens Laube (1880–1967), Latvian architect
 Clifford J. Laube (1891–1974), American newspaper editor, publisher, and Catholic poet
 James Laube, American wine critic of Wine Spectator

Places

 Laube, former name of Yablonovka, a rural locality in Saratov Oblast, Russia

German-language surnames
German toponymic surnames